The Dolph Map Company is a U.S. publisher of city and state road maps.

Based in Fort Lauderdale, Florida, it was founded in 1926 by a one-time employee of the New York-based Hagstrom Map Company. Dolph has specialized in highly detailed commercial and custom maps of cities in the southeastern United States, especially within the state of Florida. The company also publishes wall maps, digitally disseminated maps, maps on CD, print street atlases, and has published for phone directories and law enforcement agencies.

During the period between 1950 and 2000, Dolph published maps for cities in more than 20 states, though their primary focus has been the Southeastern US, and many of the 1950s and 1960s maps of cities in the Midwest and other parts of the U.S. have gone out of print.

As of 2010, maps of cities in Georgia, South Carolina, Virginia and Texas are also listed in their catalog, and custom-produced maps of cities elsewhere in the southern U.S. are commonly available through banks, real estate agencies and business organizations.

References

External links
Dolph Maps

Mass media companies of the United States
Map companies of the United States
Map publishing companies
Publishing companies established in 1926
Companies based in Fort Lauderdale, Florida